The King Edward VII is a Grade II listed public house at 47 Broadway, Stratford, London.

It was built in the early 18th century. It is opposite St John's Church and has original pedimented doors and early 19th-century bay windows. It was originally called "The King of Prussia", either in honour of Frederick the Great or else after King Frederick William IV, who visited the area in 1842 to meet Elizabeth Fry, the prison reformer. However, the name was changed at the start of World War I in 1914 for patriotic reasons.

References

Grade II listed buildings in the London Borough of Newham
Grade II listed pubs in London
Pubs in the London Borough of Newham
Stratford, London